Maybe I'm Dreaming is the debut studio album by American electronica project Owl City, released on March 17, 2008. Despite having been self-released and not recorded by any major producer, it managed to reach the top 20 of the Billboard Dance/Electronic Albums chart. The seventh track, "The Technicolor Phase", is featured on Alice in Wonderlands compilation album, Almost Alice.

Following the surprise success of Owl City's second album, Ocean Eyes, Maybe I'm Dreaming was pressed and re-released by Universal Republic on March 30, 2010.

An official music video for the song "Early Birdie" was filmed in March 2008 by Adam Young's childhood friends/bandmates Andy and Anthony Johnson (Windsor Airlift), and then released on January 13, 2011, via YouTube.

Critical reception

Anthony Tognazzini of AllMusic gave a positive review stating, "he builds on the skills he was developing on Of June, and turns in a strong effort, full of durable, breezy melodies, personal lyrics, and carefully orchestrated folktronica." 

Track listing

Notes
"On the Wing" and "The Saltwater Room" were included on the band's second studio album Ocean Eyes.

PersonnelOwl CityAdam Young – vocals, keyboards, synthesizers, drums, programming, engineer, audio mixerAdditional musicians and production'
 Breanne Düren – additional vocals (1, 4, 6)
 Austin Tofte - additional guitars, additional instrumentation, additional vocals (1, 2, 5)

Charts

Notes and miscellanea
On November 24, 2010, Andy Johnson of Windsor Airlift published his cover of "Sky Diver" on YouTube.

References

External links

2008 debut albums
Owl City albums